Agenor Muniz (born 24 June 1949) is a former footballer. Originally from CR Vasco da Gama in the Brazilian metropolis Rio de Janeiro, in 1971 he joined Eastern Suburbs Hakoah, later well known as Sydney City in Australia, where he won several titles. To date he remains the sole Brazilian to ever play for the Australian national football team in an official match.

Career

Clubs
The winger and midfielder Muniz played for Brazilian team CR Vasco da Gama in Rio de Janeiro from 1966 to 1971. In 1971, he was brought to Australia alongside four more Brazilians, including Hilton Silva and Luis de Melo, by then so-called Eastern Suburbs Hakoah of Sydney. With the club he won the NSW Premiership of 1971, 1973 and 1974 and the Ampol Cup of 1973. In 1977, he won with the club the Australian Championship by winning the first edition of the National Soccer League.

Early May 1977 he joined league competitor Adelaide City. With the club he won the 1979 Cup of Australia defeating St. George in the final 3–2. In 1980 Agenor Muniz was runner-up as Player of the Year behind Queensland policeman Jim Hermiston, a former Scottish Aberdeen FC player.

In 1981 Muniz played again for Sydney's Eastern suburbs in the NSL, then trading as Sydney City. With this team, coached by Eddie Thomson he won, playing alongside legendary John Kosmina, once more the Australian Championship.

Between 1984 and 1990 "Agi" joined Portugal Madeira Club / Dulwich Hill Madeira later known as Dulwich Hill FC as a highly successful Captain / Coach and progressed the club from NSW Inter Urban Fourth Division First Grade through to NSW Division One First Grade

National team
Muniz played 20 times for Australia between 1975 and 1978.

Coaching 
In the 2003 NSW Winter Super League Muniz coached Dulwich Hill

References 

1949 births
Living people
Australian soccer players
Australia international soccer players
Australian people of Brazilian descent
Brazilian emigrants to Australia
Brazilian footballers
CR Vasco da Gama players
National Soccer League (Australia) players
Adelaide City FC players
Association football midfielders